Mannaniya College of Arts and Science, is a general degree college located in Pangode, Thiruvananthapuram district, Kerala. It was established in the year 1995. The college is affiliated with Kerala University. This college offers different courses in arts, commerce and science.

Accreditation
The college is  recognized by the University Grants Commission (UGC).

References

External links
http://mannaniyacollege.ac.in

Universities and colleges in Thiruvananthapuram district
Educational institutions established in 1995
1995 establishments in Kerala
Arts and Science colleges in Kerala
Colleges affiliated to the University of Kerala